is a Japanese women's professional shogi player ranked 4-dan.

Women's shogi professional

Promotion history
Yamada's promotion history is as follows.
 2-kyū:  April 20, 1982
 1-dan: April 1, 1983
 2-dan: February 28, 1990
 3-dan: April 1, 2000
 4-dan: September 29, 2014

Note: All ranks are women's professional ranks.

Titles and other championships
Yamada has appeared in major titles match twice, but has yet to win a major title. She unsuccessfully challenged for the 12th  title in 1989, the 22nd  title in 2014.

Ladies Professional Players Group

References

External links
 ShogiHub: Yamada, Kumi

Japanese shogi players
Living people
Women's professional shogi players
Professional shogi players from Gunma Prefecture
People from Ōta, Gunma
1967 births